Morits is a given name. Notable people with the given name include:

Morits Skaugen (1920–2005), Norwegian yacht racer and businessman
Morits Skaugen Jr. (born 1955), Norwegian businessman, son of Morits